The Haunted House: The Sky Goblin VS Jormungandr (극장판 신비아파트: 하늘도깨비 대 요르문간드) is a South Korean movie directed by Byeon Young-Kyu.

Synopsis 

Hari and Doori go on a family trip during the winter vacation, Sinbi the goblin, Geumbi and Joomungand, the sky goblin, and the legendary monster Jormungandr, they fight against the sky goblin 'Jubi' and the legendary monster 'Jormungand' who was resurrected to protect Skymaru Castle.

See also 
 aeni
 Anime-influenced animation

References 

Animated films set in South Korea
2019 films
2019 animated films
South Korean animated films
2010s South Korean films